Nowacki (feminine: Nowacka; plural: Nowaccy) is a Polish surname. Notable people with this surname include:
Feminine
 Barbara Nowacka (born 1975), Polish politician
 Izabela Jaruga-Nowacka (1950–2010), Polish politician 
 Malgorzata Nowacka (born 1974), Canadian choreographer
 Oktawia Nowacka (born 1991), Polish modern pentathlete
Masculine
 Andrew Nowacki (born 1980), Canadian football player
 Andrzej Nowacki (born 1953), Polish artist
 Henryk Józef Nowacki (born 1946), Polish Vatican diplomat
 Jan Paweł Nowacki (1905–1979), Polish engineer
 Marcin Nowacki (born 1981), Polish footballer
 Witold Nowacki (1911–1986), Polish mathematician

See also
 
 

Polish-language surnames